Dragunov may refer to:
Dragunov (surname)
 Dragunov sniper rifle (Dragunov SVD)
 Dragunov SVU, bullpup sniper carbine